Peter Howard Hobson (born 7 June 1949) is a former South African cricketer who played a single first-class match for Orange Free State during the 1970–71 season.

Hobson was born in Maseru, in present-day Lesotho (formerly the British colony of Basutoland). He is one of only a small number of first-class cricketers to be born in that country. Hobson's sole appearance for Orange Free State came in December 1970, against Border during the 1970–71 season of the Currie Cup. In the match, played at East London's Jan Smuts Ground, he opened the bowling with Michael Jones, taking 0/64 from 15 overs in the first innings. While batting, he came in tenth in the batting order in both innings, scoring five runs in the first and 25 in the second. His team lost by six wickets, having followed on.

Notes

References

1949 births
Living people
Free State cricketers
Lesotho cricketers
People from Maseru
South African cricketers